The Voice is an Australian singing competition television series. It premiered on the Nine Network on 14 April 2012, before moving to the Seven Network in 2021. Based on the original The Voice of Holland, and part of The Voice  franchise, its first nine seasons aired on the Nine Network, with its tenth season commencing on the Seven Network on 8 August 2021.

The show aims to find currently unsigned singing talent (solo or duets, professional and amateur) contested by aspiring singers, drawn from public auditions. The winners receive a recording contract with Universal Music Australia or EMI Music Australia, as well as A$100,000 and other prizes. Winners of the eleven seasons have been: Karise Eden, Harrison Craig, Anja Nissen, Ellie Drennan, Alfie Arcuri, Judah Kelly, Sam Perry, Diana Rouvas, Chris Sebastian, Bella Taylor Smith, and Lachie Gill.

The series employs a panel of four coaches who critique the artists' performances and guide their teams of selected artists through the remainder of the season. They also compete to ensure that their act wins the competition, thus making them the winning coach. The original panel featured Delta Goodrem, Joel Madden, Seal and Keith Urban; the panel for the most recent eleventh season featured Urban, Guy Sebastian, Rita Ora and Jessica Mauboy. Other judges from previous seasons include Ricky Martin, Kylie Minogue, will.i.am, Benji Madden, Jessie J, Ronan Keating, Joe Jonas, Kelly Rowland, and Boy George.

Format
The show is part of the television franchise The Voice and is structured as three phases: blind auditions, battle rounds and live performance shows. In 2017, the show added another phase: the knockouts between the blind auditions and the battles. The winner receives a recording contract with Universal Music or EMI (2019) as well as A$100,000 and other prizes.

Blind auditions
Four judges/coaches, all noteworthy recording artists, choose teams of contestants through a blind audition process during the auditioner's performance. If two or more judges want the same singer (as happens frequently), the singer has the final choice of coach. Each coach must recruit a number of artists (12 in seasons 1, 4-9 and 11, 14 in seasons 2 and 3) to their team in the blind auditions to move on to the next phase of the competition. In season 10, coaches can complete their teams without a specific number of members.

A new element was introduced in season 9: the Block. Aside from the main button, each coach has three other buttons with the names of their fellow coaches. When a coach wants to get the specific contestant but does not want another coach to do so, they may press the block button to block them from getting the contestant. The coach who wants to use the block and the coach who is being blocked have to turn before any block can be used. They have two blocks to use in the entire phase of the blind auditions and 2 coaches can be blocked in a single audition. In season 11, a coach can block another coach at any time, even during their pitch.

Also, in Season 11, a Battle Pass was introduced, where in each coach can send one artist immediately in the battle rounds by pressing their silver button. This can be used only once in the entire blind auditions.

Knockout and battle rounds
Each team of singers are mentored and developed by their coach. In the second stage, called the battles, two members from the same team battle it out and perform a duet together. After the battle round, coaches must choose only one to advance. In season 2, a new element was featured in the battle rounds: The Save. Each coach can save one losing artist to join them to their team and reinstating them in the competition. Starting from season 3, the coaches can save two artists instead of one.

Next in the battle rounds was the showdown rounds (which was also introduced in Season 2). In the showdown rounds, each team is grouped into two groups of four artists and will perform a song. One will be saved by the public, the lowest-voter will be immediately eliminated, and the remaining two will be sent to the sing-off. In the sing-off, the artists will sing a reprise of their blind audition and the coaches can only select one artist to advance to the finals. This was slightly changed in season 3, wherein three groups of three artists will perform a song. From each group, one will be saved by the public, the lowest-voter will be immediately eliminated, and the remaining artist will be sent into the sing-off. Those artists that are sent to the sing-off will have to perform a reprise of their blind audition and coaches can only advance one of them to the finals.

In season 4, the showdown round was replaced by the Super Battles. Each coach chooses two of their artists to go straight to the live shows via a Fast Pass. The remaining six artists from each team will be grouped in two groups of three artists. Each artist will sing a different song and coaches can only select one artist to the Live shows. This was slightly changed in season 5, where in each coach must group their team into two groups of four artists each. Those four artists sing an individual song following a theme picked by their coaches. Only two from each group will be able to advance to the live shows.

Starting in season 6, the battles and the knockout rounds were swapped. In the knockouts, coaches pick three of their acts to go against each other in a sing off, with a theme. They all have different songs, after which the coach chooses which act will advance into the next phase, the battles. Once the coach has made a choice, the other coaches have an opportunity to steal two losing artists that were rejected by their coach. Starting in season 8, the coaches can save their own artists. After the knockout rounds is the battle rounds, where artists perform a duet together. Coaches must choose only one to advance, while the other one will be eliminated. Starting from season 7, coaches can select one losing artist in the battles to be a wildcard and might advance to the live shows. However, only one from the four wildcards will advance to the Top 13. In season 8, the coaches’ wildcards are immediately advanced to the final.

In season 9, the battle rounds happened after the blind auditions. The same rules were applied in the earlier seasons, with two saves available, and the coaches can save their own artists as well. After the battle rounds comes the playoffs, where each coach pairs two of their artists together, with each artist singing an individual song following a theme. After all their team's playoffs were done, the coaches chose one of their losing artists as a wildcard and moves on to the Showdowns. In the Showdowns, all artists in their teams will performs and coaches can only takes 2 of them through to the semi-finals.

In season 10, there were no battle rounds and only the knockout rounds were implemented. In that season's knockouts, each artist must perform to their coach. After each act performs, the coaches have three options: to either send the artist straight to the semi-final, send the artist home, or decide at the end of the show when all artists have performed. Each coach can only take two artists through to the semi-final.

In season 11, a new round was introduced, the Callbacks. Coaches will cut down their teams from twelve artists to six (five artists and an Battles Pass artist). Some will have to perform their blinds song, some will have to perform in the singoffs (coaches will choose a theme, like on the knockouts round on seasons 6 to 8) or do both. Coaches can decide to move on one or two or all of them in the group as long as they have saved five of them. Then to the battles. Coaches will pair six artists (five from the Callbacks and one Battles Pass artist). However, this season, there are no save. Artists won the battles will moving on to the Singoffs. After the battles, coaches will select one artist from three or four of them straight to the semi-finals. The rest of them have to performed another song and only one of them advanced.

The Cut 
In season 10, this new phase was introduced and consisted of coaches cutting their teams to just five artists. This phase replaced the "battles" phase typical of past seasons.

Finals and live shows
In the final phase, the remaining contestants (Final 8) compete against each other. The audience and coaches have equal say in deciding who moves to the Final 4 phase. With one team member remaining for each coach, the (Final 4) contestants compete in the finale with the outcome decided by public vote.

Production

In May 2011, The Daily Telegraph reported that the Nine Network would broadcast The Voice in late 2011. However, two months later, it was reported that the show would instead air in early 2012, and that the Nine Network were in talks with signing at least one international artist (especially an American) to lead its panel of coaches on the show, which were rumoured to be Christina Aguilera, George Michael, Usher, Pink and Gwen Stefani. In September 2011, the Herald Sun reported that the Nine Network were planning to sign Australia's Got Talent judge Dannii Minogue as one of the coaches. Anthony Callea, Vanessa Amorosi and former Pussycat Dolls member Ashley Roberts all publicly expressed interest in coaching roles. However, Keith Urban, Delta Goodrem, Seal and Joel Madden were ultimately confirmed as the four coaches for the first season. On signing the four coaches, Michael Healy, the Nine Network's Director of Television, said: "To secure such world-class coaches has been a coup for this show and the network. The mix of talent and unique format will, we truly believe, be a captivating experience for our viewers."

Darren McMullen was announced as the host of the program in January 2012. Additionally, Ricki-Lee Coulter (with Seal), Darren Hayes, (Goodrem), Megan Washington (Urban) and Benji Madden (with brother Joel) were signed to pair up with the coaches as mentors for their contestants during the "Battle Round". On 10 May 2012, Faustina Agolley was announced as the show's social media correspondent during the live shows.

Filming for the blind auditions stage of the competition began on 19 February 2012 at Fox Studios in Sydney, with 121 artists featured in this phase of the selection process. The first day of filming resulted in hundreds of audience members being turned away from the studio due to overbooking of the event by an external booking agent. Filming for the battle rounds started in late March. In response to the immediate ratings success of the blind auditions, the Nine Network renewed the series for a second season on 27 April 2012.

With Urban accepting an offer to join the American Idol judging panel it was announced in September 2012 that he would not be returning as a coach for the second season. Following an extensive search process by producers, and constant media speculation on who would replace Urban, Ricky Martin was officially announced as the new coach in November 2012. In response to joining the series, Martin paid tribute to Urban saying he was "humbled to be sitting in his chair". Healy stated that Martin would bring "huge experience" and be the "perfect addition" to the coaching panel, with Goodrem, Madden and Seal all publicly expressing excitement at the news via their Twitter accounts.

The success of the first season led to the Nine Network increasing its programming run for the second season, with an extra ten hours of content to be broadcast and the season running for approximately three months instead of two. For 2014, Goodrem left the panel to join The Voice Kids, and Seal left to continue on his music career. Goodrem and Seal were in turn replaced by The Voice UK coaches Kylie Minogue and will.i.am. On 13 January 2015, it was announced that Goodrem would return to the panel, and new judges Jessie J and Benji Madden would join the series, replacing former judges Minogue and will.i.am. On 22 February 2015, it was announced that Sonia Kruger would be joining the fourth season as a co-host with McMullen. In 2015, Darren McMullen announced he was leaving The Voice, with Sonia Kruger to be a solo host in 2016.

On 28 December 2015, Ronan Keating confirmed he would replace Martin on the show's fifth season, alongside returning coaches Goodrem, Jessie J and The Madden Brothers. On 19 June 2016, it was announced that pop duo The Veronicas will briefly replace The Madden Brothers as coaches for the second live show on Sunday 19 June while the brothers are in the US on tour due to band commitments. The brothers are to due back on screen for the rest of the live shows. During an interview with NewsLitmited, the sisters stated " It's a very brutal industry to be in. We are very honest, very upfront and very real about the advise we give. We're not going to be sugar coating anything. There's not going to be anything contrived about our time on the show." Jessie J ruled out returning to the show for the 2017 show and stated "I've loved doing the show, I've done four seasons: two in the U.K., two in Sydney, but I just need to make another album."

On 8 November 2016, it was announced that Goodrem would return for her fifth season as a coach, whilst original judge Seal, who departed the series following the second season, would return and replaced Jessie J. On 8 December 2016, it was announced that Boy George would become the third coach for the series' sixth season replacing The Madden Brothers. On 24 December 2016, it was announced that Kelly Rowland would become the fourth and final coach for the series' sixth season to replace Keating.

On 11 October 2017, the series was renewed for a seventh season and it was announced that Goodrem, George and Rowland would all return. On 14 December 2017, Nine announced Joe Jonas would replace Seal as the fourth judge for the seventh season.

On 17 October 2018, the series was renewed for an eighth season and it was announced that Goodrem, George and Rowland would all return. On 14 November 2018, Nine announced Guy Sebastian would replace Jonas as the fourth judge for the eighth season. The eighth season premiered on 19 May 2019.

On 16 October 2019, the series was renewed for a ninth season and it was announced that Goodrem, George, Rowland and Sebastian would all be returning as series judges. In November 2019, Sonia Kruger announced she would be leaving Nine Network at the end of 2019, in which she will be resigning as the show's host. In January 2020, Darren McMullen was announced to return as host after his departure in 2014, along with new co-host Renee Bargh.

Due to the Acquisition of 21st Century Fox by Disney, Fox Studios has been designated to Disney and Marvel productions, resulting in ITV Studios Australia becoming the new home location for The Voice. In August 2020, it was announced Seven Network had picked up the series for its tenth season, set to broadcast sometime in the following year, with Kruger returning as host. In December of the same year, Seven announced Sebastian would continue as a coach; Jessica Mauboy and former The Voice UK coach Rita Ora were named new coaches replacing George and Goodrem, and Urban was announced to return to the coaching panel replacing Rowland.

On 16 July 2021, Seven Network and The Voice casting website announced that two new seasons will be broadcast in 2022: the upcoming eleventh regular season, and The Voice Generations. For the "generations" version, family groups, consisted in people of several ages, are the ones who can apply.

On 11 October 2021, it was announced that Sebastian, Urban, Ora, and Mauboy would all be returning as coaches for 2022.

On 9 October 2022, Urban announced that he would not be a coach for the twelfth season. On 30 October 2022, it was announced that Mauboy would be returning for her third season as a coach. In March 2023, Jason Derulo was announced as a new judge taking the place of Urban.

Coaches and hosts

Timeline of coaches

Key 
 Featured as a full-time coach
 Featured as a part-time advisor

Timeline of hosts

Key 
 Main presenter
 Backstage presenter

Coaches' teams
 Winning coach; winners are denoted by boldface.

 Contestant is deceased

Series overview
Warning: the following table presents a significant amount of different colors.

Seasons synopsis

Season 1 (2012) 

Karise Eden was crowned the first winner of The Voice Australia. Darren Percival was runner-up, followed by Rachael Leahcar in third place and Sarah De Bono in fourth place. Season one saw 80% of artists enter the music charts, culminating in 9 out of the top 10 in finale week. Eden made history with eight singles in the charts and both a number-one single and album.

Season 2 (2013) 

The second season of The Voice Australia crowned Harrison Craig the winner, under Seal's tutelage. Keith Urban did not return as a coach after it was officially announced he would become a judge on American Idol. The Nine Network confirmed on 29 November 2012 that Latin pop star Ricky Martin would replace Urban as the new coach. Luke Kennedy placed second under the new coach, with Celia Pavey third and Danny Ross fourth.

Season 3 (2014) 

On 26 November 2013, it was announced that Seal and Delta Goodrem would not be returning as coaches for the third season. The same day, it was announced that The Voice UK coaches will.i.am and Kylie Minogue would join Joel Madden and Ricky Martin. Taping for the third season began on 14 January 2014, with the Battle rounds commencing in March. Blind auditions began airing on 4 May 2014. Anja Nissen was announced the winner with Jackson Thomas in second place, Johnny Rollins in third, and Frank Lakoudis and ZK in fourth.

Season 4 (2015) 

In January 2015, it was confirmed that Goodrem would return to her judges chair, and would be joined by former The Voice UK coach
Jessie J and Benji Madden. On 22 February 2015, Sonia Kruger was announced as the new co-host. Ellie Drennan was announced the winner with Joe Moore in second place, Nathan Hawes in third, and Liam Maihi in fourth.

Season 5 (2016) 

In July 2015, it was confirmed that The Voice would return in 2016. Jessie J, Goodrem and The Madden Brothers were announced as returning coaches; Martin was replaced by Ronan Keating. On 28 December 2015, McMullen announced he would not be returning as host of The Voice. The season began airing on 1 May 2016. Alfie Arcuri was announced the winner with Adam Ladell in second place, Tash Lockhart in third, and Ellen Reed in fourth.

Season 6 (2017) 

In November 2016, it was confirmed that Goodrem would be returning as a coach on the show for her fifth season and that she would be joined by former coach, Seal, returning after a three-season absence. The following month, former The Voice UK coach, Boy George, was announced as the third coach. In December 2016, it was confirmed that former The X Factor UK judge and singer, Kelly Rowland, would be the fourth and final coach. The season began airing on 24 April 2017. Judah Kelly was announced the winner with Hoseah Partsch in second place, Fasika Ayallew in third, and Lucy Sugerman in fourth.

Season 7 (2018) 

On 11 October 2017, the series was renewed for a seventh season and it was announced that Goodrem, George and Rowland would all return. On 14 December 2017, Nine announced Joe Jonas would replace Seal as the fourth judge for the seventh season. The season began airing on 15 April 2018. Sam Perry was announced as the winner with The Voice Kids finalist Bella Paige in second place, Sheldon Riley in third, and Aydan Calafiore in fourth.

Season 8 (2019) 

On 17 October 2018, the series was renewed for an eighth season and it was announced that Goodrem, George and Rowland would all return. On 14 November 2018, Nine announced Guy Sebastian would replace Jonas as the fourth judge for the eighth season. The season began airing on 19 May 2019.

This season, only the Semifinals and the Grand Finale were broadcast live. Each coach was allowed to advance a top four to the Finals: Diana Rouvas was announced as the winner with Daniel Shaw in second, Zeek Power in third, and Jordan Anthony in fourth.

Season 9 (2020) 

On 16 October 2019, the series was renewed for a ninth season with coaches from the previous season returning. On 25 January 2020, it was announced that Darren McMullen and Renee Bargh would act as successors to Kruger as hosts. The block was also introduced as a twist for the blind auditions, giving coaches the power to block another coach from getting an artist.

Season 10 (2021) 
In August 2020, it was announced Seven Network had picked up the series for its tenth season, set to broadcast in 2021, with Sonia Kruger returning as host. In December of the same year, Seven announced that Guy Sebastian, Keith Urban, Rita Ora, and Jessica Mauboy were the coaches, replacing Kelly Rowland, Delta Goodrem and Boy George. The grand finale was prerecorded in April 2021, with four different endings being taped. The show was broadcast on 12 September 2021 with the winner, Bella Taylor Smith, being decided by a viewer poll.

Season 11 (2022) 

In October 2021, it was announced that Keith Urban, Jessica Mauboy, Rita Ora, and Guy Sebastian would all return as coaches for the eleventh series. Sonia Kruger returns as host. Some changes to the format were also introduced, The blinds rules changed, with each coach having 12 spots, replacing the previous unlimited spots rule. This season also introduces the Battle Pass. Coaches will have a new button, in addition to the main button and the block buttons. The Battle Pass allows a coach to automatically send the contestant to the battles. Each coach could only press the button for one artist in the entire blinds. The Cut was scrapped and replaced by the 'Callbacks' in which each coach has to cut their team down from 12 to 6. The battle rounds also returned; coaches are to cut their team from 6 to 3 by paring two of their artists to sing the same song as a duet. Then the coaches must pick two out of their 3 winners to advance to the semi-finals. From the semi-finals, each coach must choose one artist to advance to the pre-recorded finale. Similar to last season, the winner was determined by a viewer poll, with Lachie Gill being declared the winner.

Spin-offs

The Voice Kids

The Voice Generations 

On 16 July 2021, The Voice casting website announced the application for a new version of the show to be broadcast in 2022: The Voice: Generations, where family or friend groups consisting in singers of all ages are the ones who can apply. This is an original version of The Voice franchise, with the idea being adapted to the Lithuanian series a few weeks later. The first season is hosted by Sonia Kruger and has Jessica Mauboy, Rita Ora, Guy Sebastian and Keith Urban as coaches.

Music releases by contestants 

Two The Voice Australia winners, Karise Eden and Harrison Craig's, albums have debuted at number one on the ARIA albums chart. Besides both winners, Darren Percival, Rachael Leahcar, Sarah De Bono, Prinnie Stevens, Emma Birdsall, Adam Martin and Lakyn of season 1, and Luke Kennedy, Emma Pask, Danny Ross, Ms. Murphy and Caterina Torres of season 2 have all signed record contracts with Universal Music Australia.

Possibly the most notable alumni of the series is season 2 finalist Celia Pavey, who has achieved a successful pop career in Australia under the name Vera Blue. Her single "Papercuts" with rapper Illy peaked at #2 on the ARIA singles chart, and her second album Perennial debuted on the ARIA albums chart at #6. Eleven of her singles have achieved either Gold or Platinum status in the country.

Another notable alumni is season 4 contestant Grace Pitts, who has had a successful career under the name GRAACE, receiving significant airplay on Triple J.

Reception

Viewership

Awards and nominations

See also

 List of Australian music television shows
 The Voice (franchise)
 List of Australian television series
 List of programs broadcast by Nine Network
 List of programs broadcast by Seven Network

References

External links

 Official website

 
Nine Network original programming
Seven Network original programming
2012 Australian television series debuts
Australian music television series
English-language television shows
Music competitions in Australia
Television shows set in Sydney
Australian television series based on Dutch television series
Television series by Eureka
Television series by ITV Studios